Biraotori Dam  is a gravity dam located in Hokkaido Prefecture in Japan. The dam is used for flood control and water supply. The catchment area of the dam is 234 km2. The dam impounds about 310  ha of land when full and can store 45800 thousand cubic meters of water. The construction of the dam was started on 1973 and completed in 2021.

References

Dams in Hokkaido